Tarique Ahmed Siddique, rcds, psc is a retired major general of Bangladesh Army and the Defence and Security adviser to the Prime Minister of Bangladesh, Sheikh Hasina.

Personal life 
Major General Tarique Ahmed Siddique  is the younger brother of Shafique Ahmed Siddique, the husband of Sheikh Rehana, the only surviving sister of Bangladeshi Prime Minister Sheikh Hasina.

Career
Siddique served in Directorate General of Forces Intelligence. From 17 November 2001 to 17 March 2002 he served as the Engineer in Chief of the army. He also served as Senior Instructor (Army) in Defense Services Command and Staff College (DSCSC) Mirpur.

After retirement from active service he was appointed as chief of personal security to Sheikh Hasina when she was the opposition leader. He was present during 2004 Dhaka grenade attack which tried to assassinate Sheikh Hasina. He was appointed to the post of Adviser to Prime Minister in 2009. He advises the Prime Minister on anti-terrorism activities. He inaugurated the Disaster Response Exercise and Exchange in 2016. He is a graduate of Defense Services Command & Staff College (DSCSC) Bangladesh. He has done RCDS course from Royal College of Defense Studies (RCDS) London, United Kingdom.

In 2012, a report by Salah Choudhury published in openDemocracy raised allegations that Colonel Shahid Uddin Khan was engaged in influence peddling and corrupt practices with the backing of Siddique. According to the report Khan has a number of business in which Siddique's wife and daughter are shareholders. According to an Al Jazeera Investigative Unit report, published on 29 March 2019, Siddique used intelligence agencies to abduct employees of a business associate. The business associate, Colonel Shahid Uddin Khan, is currently in exile in the United Kingdom. The family members of men have no heard from them since their abduction. As defence advisor, he had absolute control over the intelligence agencies and military of Bangladesh.

References

Living people
Bangladesh Army generals
Sheikh Mujibur Rahman family
Year of birth missing (living people)